Felipe Moreira Roque  (born 19 May 1997) is a Brazilian volleyball player. He is a current member of the Brazil men's national volleyball team. On club level, he plays for Brazilian club Vôlei Taubaté.

Sporting achievements

Clubs
 National championships
 2020/2021  Brazilian Championship, with Vôlei Taubaté

Youth national team
 2016  CSV U21 South American Championship
 2017  U21 Pan American Cup

References

External links
 Player profile at WorldofVolley.com
 Player profile at Volleybox.net
 2017 FIVB U21 World Championship – Team Brazil
 2019 FIVB World Cup – Team Brazil

1997 births
Living people
People from Juiz de Fora
Brazilian men's volleyball players
Pan American Games medalists in volleyball
Pan American Games bronze medalists for Brazil
Volleyball players at the 2019 Pan American Games
Medalists at the 2019 Pan American Games
Opposite hitters
Sportspeople from Minas Gerais